Sarah Ellen Polley  (born January 8, 1979) is a Canadian filmmaker, political activist and retired actress. She first garnered attention as a child actress for her role as Ramona Quimby in the television series Ramona, based on Beverly Cleary's books. Subsequently this led to her role as Sara Stanley in the Canadian television series Road to Avonlea (1990–1996). She has starred in many feature films, including The Adventures of Baron Munchausen (1988), Exotica (1994), The Sweet Hereafter (1997), Guinevere (1999), Go (1999), The Weight of Water (2000), No Such Thing (2001), My Life Without Me (2003), Dawn of the Dead (2004), Splice (2009), and Mr. Nobody (2009).

Polley made her feature film directorial debut with Away from Her (2006), for which she won the Canadian Screen Award for Best Director and was nominated for the Academy Award for Best Adapted Screenplay. Polley's second film, Take This Waltz (2011), premiered at the 2011 Toronto International Film Festival, followed by her first documentary film, Stories We Tell (2012). She also wrote the miniseries Alias Grace, based on the 1996 novel of the same name by Margaret Atwood. In 2022, Polley wrote and directed the film Women Talking, based on the 2018 novel of the same name by Miriam Toews, for which she won the Academy Award for Best Adapted Screenplay.

Early life
Polley was born and raised in Toronto, Ontario, Canada, the youngest of five children born to Diane Elizabeth Polley (née MacMillan). Her siblings are Susy and John Buchan from Diane's first marriage to George Deans-Buchan, and Mark and Joanna Polley from her second marriage to Michael Polley (1933–2018), a British-born actor who became an insurance agent after Diane and he started a family.

Her mother was an actress (best known for playing Gloria Beechham in 44 episodes of the Canadian TV series Street Legal) and a casting director. She died of cancer the week of Polley's 11th birthday.

Polley suffered from severe scoliosis as a child, and underwent a spinal operation at 15 that required her to spend the next year in bed recovering.

Polley was raised by Diane and Michael. During her childhood, Polley's siblings teased her because she bore no physical resemblance to Michael. Polley discovered as an adult that her biological father was actually Harry Gulkin, with whom her mother had an affair (as chronicled in Polley's film Stories We Tell). Gulkin, the son of Russian Jewish immigrants, was a Quebec-born film producer who produced the 1975 Canadian film Lies My Father Told Me, and had met Diane after attending a play in which she acted in Montreal in 1978. When Polley turned 18, she decided to follow up on suggestions from her mother's friends that her biological father might be Geoff Bowes—one of three castmates from her mother's play in Montreal. Meeting with Gulkin as just someone who could provide information about Diane in Montreal, he informed Polley of his affair with Diane. Gulkin's paternity was later confirmed by a DNA test.

Polley attended Subway Academy II, then Earl Haig Secondary School, but dropped out at age 15. By the age of 15 she was living on her own and credits the Ontario Coalition Against Poverty for housing her and developing her work with activism.

Career

Early career
Her first appearance on screen was at the age of four, as Molly in the film One Magic Christmas. She was in the pilot episode for Friday the 13th – The Series, as well as appearing in a small role in William Fruet's sci-fi horror film Blue Monkey, both in 1987.  At age eight, she was cast as Ramona Quimby in the television series Ramona, based on Beverly Cleary's books.

That same year, she played one of the lead characters in Terry Gilliam's The Adventures of Baron Munchausen. Polley burst into the public eye in 1990 as Sara Stanley on the popular CBC television series Road to Avonlea. The series made her famous and financially independent, and she was hailed as "Canada's Sweetheart" by the popular press. The show was picked up by the Disney Channel for distribution in the United States. At the age of 12 (around 1991), Polley attended an awards ceremony while wearing a peace sign to protest the first Gulf War. Disney executives asked her to remove it, and she refused. This soured her relationship with Disney, but she continued on Road to Avonlea until 1994. The show ran until 1996; Polley did return as Sara Stanley for an episode in 1995 and for the series finale.

In 1994 Polley made her theatre debut at the Stratford Festival playing Alice in Alice Through the Looking Glass, an adaptation of Lewis Carroll's book of the same name. Polley ended her run early claiming complications from scoliosis. In 2022 she revealed she had in fact been suffering from intense stage fright, something that continued to plague her into adulthood.

Transition into more adult roles
Polley appeared as Lily on the CBC television series Straight Up. It ran from 1996 to 1998 and she won the Gemini Award for Best Performance in a Children's or Youth Program or Series for her role. Polley's subsequent role as Nicole Burnell in the 1997 film The Sweet Hereafter brought her considerable attention in the United States; she was a favourite at the Sundance Film Festival. Her character in the film was an aspiring singer, and on the film's soundtrack, she performed covers of The Tragically Hip's "Courage" and Jane Siberry's "One More Colour," as well as the film's title track, which she co-wrote with Mychael Danna.

In 1998, Polley appeared in the critically acclaimed film Last Night. The following year, she starred as part of the ensemble cast in the film Go. She was cast in the role of Penny Lane in the big-budget 2000 film Almost Famous, but dropped out of the project to return to Canada for the low-budget The Law of Enclosures. Her role in the 2003 film My Life Without Me garnered the Genie Award for Best Performance by an Actress in a Leading Role in 2004. In the same year, she starred in a lead role in the remake of Dawn of the Dead, which was a departure from her other indie roles.

In 2005, she starred in The Secret Life of Words, opposite Tim Robbins and Julie Christie. She was nominated as Best European Actress by the European Film Academy for her role as Hanna.

In 2006, Polley took a role on the acclaimed series Slings and Arrows during its third and final season. Polley's father, Michael Polley, was a regular on the show during its entire three-season run. She served as a member of the 2007 Cannes Film Festival jury.

In 2008, Polley appeared as Nabby Adams in the HBO miniseries based on the life of John Adams. Polley played Elise in Jaco Van Dormael's Mr. Nobody, which was released in 2010. Critical response has praised the film's artistry and Polley's acting.  Later that year, she also appeared in a cameo role in Bruce MacDonald's film Trigger.

Though Polley never officially announced her retirement from acting she has not taken another acting role since 2010, transitioning into a writing and directing career.

Directing career
In 1999, Polley made her first short film, The Best Day of My Life, for the On the Fly 4 Film Festival. She also made a second short film that year, Don't Think Twice. Polley attended the Canadian Film Centre's directing program in 2001, and won the Genie Award for Best Live Action Short Drama in 2003 for her short film I Shout Love. She made her feature-length film directing debut with Away from Her, which Polley adapted from the Alice Munro short story The Bear Came Over the Mountain. The movie, starring Julie Christie (with whom she had played in No Such Thing, 2001, and The Secret Life of Words, 2005), debuted at the Toronto International Film Festival on September 11, 2006, as part of the TIFF's Gala showcase.

Away from Her was acquired by Lionsgate for release in the US for the sum of $750,000. It drew rave reviews from Variety, The Hollywood Reporter, and the three Toronto dailies, both for the performances of Christie and her co-star, Canadian actor Gordon Pinsent, and for Polley's direction. It also earned Polley a 2007 Academy Award nomination for Best Adapted Screenplay, and won the Genie Award for Best Achievement in Direction. At the 2008 Genies, she was also awarded the Claude Jutra Award, which recognizes outstanding achievement by a first-time feature film director.

Polley wrote and directed her second feature, Take This Waltz starring Michelle Williams, Luke Kirby, Seth Rogen, and Sarah Silverman, which premiered at the Toronto International Film Festival in 2011.

Her documentary film Stories We Tell premiered at the 69th Venice International Film Festival in competition in the Venice Days category, and its North American premiere followed at the 2012 Toronto International Film Festival. The critically acclaimed documentary examined family secrets in Polley's own childhood. She was awarded the CAN$100,000 prize for best Canadian film of the year by the Toronto Film Critics Association. In 2017, Polley executive produced the film A Better Man (2017), 

In late 2012, Polley announced that she would be adapting Margaret Atwood's novel Alias Grace. Polley first wrote to Atwood asking to adapt the novel when she was 17. They held off for 20 years until she was ready to make the show. In August 2014, during a profile of her work as a director, Polley announced that Alias Grace was being adapted into a six-part miniseries. In June 2016, the series was confirmed with Polley writing and producing. The series premiered in 2017 on CBC Television in Canada; it streams on Netflix globally, outside of Canada. It received positive reviews from critics.

In June 2014, it was announced that she would be writing and directing an adaptation of John Green's Looking for Alaska. In March 2015, Polley was hired to write the script for a new adaptation of Little Women, as well as potentially direct; however, Polley's involvement in the project never went beyond initial discussions, despite reports. In her 2022 essay collection Run Towards the Danger, Polley revealed she had been working on a second draft of the Little Women screenplay when she had a traumatic head injury resulting in post-concussion syndrome that left her with symptoms for four years so she was temporarily unable to work. It was subsequently announced in June that, due to scheduling conflicts, Polley would no longer be directing Looking for Alaska.

In an interview, Polley stated that she takes pride in her work and enjoys both acting and directing, but is not keen on combining the two:I like the feeling of keeping them separate. I find that really gratifying. I can't imagine combining those. For me, I love the feeling of using different parts of my brain separately. In a 2015 retrospective of the movie Go, Mike D'Angelo of The A.V. Club commented that Polley's decision to go into directing had "deprived the world of many potentially great performances", calling her a "superb actor".

In December 2020, it was announced Polley would direct Women Talking based upon the novel of the same name by Miriam Toews for Orion Pictures. It premiered at the 49th Telluride Film Festival on September 2, 2022, and went into wide release on December 23, 2022. It was released to widespread acclaim, with 90% of critics giving it a positive review on Rotten Tomatoes. Shirley Li of The Atlantic called it "vibrant cinema," while Anna Bogutskaya of Time Out (magazine) said that it "imagines female emancipation as an honest, raging, caring experience." Polley won the Academy Award for Best Adapted Screenplay at the 95th Academy Awards, and the film was also nominated for the Academy Award for Best Picture.

Writing career
Polley has written numerous essays over the years about her experiences as a child star. In 2022, she released her first book of essays, the autobiographical, Run Towards the Danger which contains six essays that examine aspects of Polley's career on stage, screen, and on film, detailing her roles in a Stratford Festival production of Alice Through the Looking Glass, as well as her breakout roles in The Adventures of Baron Munchausen and the TV series Road to Avonlea. The book also revealed for the first time that Polley had been a victim of Jian Ghomeshi who sexually and physically assaulted her when she was 16 and he was 28.

Political and social activism
Following the row with Disney as a twelve-year-old for wearing a peace sign to protest against the Gulf War, Polley dedicated more of her efforts to politics, becoming a prominent member of the Ontario New Democratic Party (ONDP), where Ontario legislator Peter Kormos was her political mentor. In 1996, she gave a nomination speech for Kormos at the ONDP leadership convention which she later referred to as the "proudest moment in [her] life".

In 1995, she lost two back teeth after being struck by a riot police officer during a protest against the provincial Progressive Conservative government of Mike Harris in Queen's Park. She was subsequently involved with the Ontario Coalition Against Poverty. She subsequently scaled back her political activism.
She was part of a group in 2001 which opposed the proposed Free Trade Area of the Americas. The 3rd Summit of the Americas was held in Quebec City in April 2001. In 2003, she was part of former Toronto mayor David Miller's transition advisory team.

In 2009, Polley directed a two-minute short film in support of the Heart and Stroke Foundation of Canada. In advance of the film's airing in Canada during the 82nd Academy Awards, and following news reports that characterized the film as a marketing exercise for the margarine company Becel, Polley withdrew her association with the film. "In December 2009, I made a film to be aired during the Academy Awards that I believed was to promote the Heart and Stroke Foundation. When I agreed to make this film ["The Heart"], I was thrilled, as I was proud to be associated with the work of this incredible organization. However, I have since learned that my film is also being used to promote a product. Regretfully, I am forced to remove my name from the film and disassociate myself from it. I have never actively promoted any corporate brand, and cannot do so now." In response, Becel said it was a "founding sponsor" of the Heart Truth campaign and had commissioned the film "to put heart health on the radar of Canadian women".

In January 2012, Polley endorsed Toronto MP Peggy Nash in the 2012 New Democratic Party leadership race to succeed Jack Layton.

On October 15, 2017, Polley wrote an op-ed piece in The New York Times detailing her experience with Harvey Weinstein and with Hollywood's treatment of women generally, and making a connection between Hollywood's gendered power relations and Polley's not having acted in years.

Personal life
In 2007, Polley discovered that her father, Michael Polley, who had raised her, was not her biological father. The story of her mother's affair and her biological father Harry Gulkin, producer of the film Lies My Father Told Me (1975), was chronicled in Polley's film Stories We Tell (2012).

On September 10, 2003, Polley married Canadian film editor David Wharnsby, her boyfriend of seven years. They divorced five years later, in 2008.

On August 23, 2011, Polley married David Sandomierski, who at the time was working on his SJD degree (equivalent to a PhD in law) at the University of Toronto, which he would complete six years later, in 2017. They have three children together.

In 2022, Polley said that she had been sexually assaulted by then Moxy Früvous singer Jian Ghomeshi while on a date when she was 16 and he was 28. She was dissuaded by family and friends from coming forward with her experiences, but ultimately chose to do so in her autobiographical essay collection Run Towards the Danger.

Polley is an atheist.

Filmography

In acting roles

Film

Television

As writer, director, or producer

Awards and nominations
On October 16, 2010, it was announced that she would receive a star on Canada's Walk of Fame. In June 2013, she received the National Arts Centre Award recognizing achievement over the past performance year at the Governor General's Performing Arts Awards, where she was the subject of a short vignette by Ann Marie Fleming entitled Stories Sarah Tells. Polley was appointed an Officer of the Order of Canada on December 30, 2013.

References

External links

 

1979 births
Living people
20th-century Canadian actresses
20th-century Canadian screenwriters
20th-century Canadian women writers
21st-century Canadian actresses
21st-century Canadian screenwriters
21st-century Canadian women writers
Actresses from Toronto
Best Actress Genie and Canadian Screen Award winners
Best Director Genie and Canadian Screen Award winners
Best First Feature Genie and Canadian Screen Award winners
Best Screenplay Genie and Canadian Screen Award winners
Best Supporting Actress in a Drama Series Canadian Screen Award winners
Canadian atheists
Canadian child actresses
Canadian Comedy Award winners
Canadian documentary film directors
Canadian film actresses
Canadian Film Centre alumni
Canadian people of Scottish descent
Canadian people of Russian-Jewish descent
Canadian television actresses
Canadian television directors
Canadian voice actresses
Canadian women documentary filmmakers
Canadian women film directors
Canadian women screenwriters
Canadian women television directors
Directors of Genie and Canadian Screen Award winners for Best Live Action Short Drama
Directors of Genie and Canadian Screen Award winners for Best Documentary Film
Film directors from Toronto
Governor General's Performing Arts Award winners
Jewish atheists
Officers of the Order of Canada
Screenwriters from Ontario
Writers from Toronto
Writers Guild of America Award winners
Best Adapted Screenplay Academy Award winners